Dzheyrakh - is a village and administrative center of Dzheyrakhsky District, in the Republic of Ingushetia, Russia.

Etymology 
The name "Dzheyrakh" is associated with the Arabic name Jarrah ("inflicting wounds"). According to Suleymanov, the name of the village is associated with Arab military commander Djarakh ibn Abadallah al-Khakami, who was a vicar of the Arab caliph in Armenia and northern Iran between 724 and 730 A.D.  According to the notion, Al-Jarrah ibn Abdallah led military campaign in the Northern Caucasus through the Darial Gorge. A connection with the word Ingush жӏар — cross, is also possible.

Geography 

Dzheyrakh is situated on the left bank of Armkhi river, south-west from the capital of Ingushetia, Magas.

History 
The history of Dzheyrakh, a village in the Republic of Ingushetia, dates back to the end of the 16th century to the beginning of the 17th century, when the Ingush society (shakhar) of Dzheyrakhoy was formed. The inhabitants of this society were also referred to as "Erokhan people." The first recorded mention of the village of Dzheirakh can be found in the Georgian historian Vakhushti Bagrationi's "Geography of Georgia," written in 1745.

According to historical records, Dzheyrakh was founded by the Ingush families of the Tsurovs and Lyanovs, who established two villages. The first recorded interaction between the Dzheyrakhites and the Russians occurred in 1830, during General Abkhazov's expedition.

Since October 1993, Dzheyrakh has served as the administrative center of the Dzheyrakhsky district.

Demography

Gallery

References

Bibliography 
 
 
 

Rural localities in Ingushetia